is a Japanese professional sumo wrestler. He made his professional debut in 2005 and reached the top makuuchi division in 2011, the first wrestler born in the Heisei era to do so. His highest rank has been ōzeki. He has been runner-up in a tournament seven times and has earned twelve special prizes: six for Fighting Spirit, four for Outstanding Performance and two for Technique. He has won five gold stars for defeating yokozuna. After achieving 34 wins in the three tournaments from January to May 2017, he was officially promoted to ōzeki on May 31, 2017. He maintained the rank for a total of 15 tournaments.

Early life and sumo background
Takayasu was born in Tsuchiura, Ibaraki to Eiji Takayasu and Bebelita Bernadas. His father is from Ibaraki Prefecture and his mother is from the island of Bohol in the Philippines. He has a brother, Hiroyuki, who is five years senior. He was a catcher on his junior high school baseball team and expected to play for his high school club as well, but his father encouraged him to take up sumo, having noticed his physical resemblance to fellow Ibaraki native and sumo wrestler Kisenosato. Through his father's recommendation he joined Kisenosato's Naruto stable (now Tagonoura stable) upon graduating from junior high school. Takayasu ran away from the stable several times due to the severe training, but on each occasion his father persuaded him to return.

Career

Early career
On his entry to Naruto stable, he was already 180 centimeters tall and weighed 120 kilograms, and consequently had much expectation pinned on him from the start. His first tournament was in March, 2005.  He made steady progress through the lower divisions, with only a few losing record or make-koshi tournaments.  He won the yūshō or championship in the third makushita division in September, 2010 with a perfect 7–0 record. This propelled him into jūryō division, where along with Masunoyama became one of the first two sekitori to be born in the Heisei era. He decided against adopting a traditional shikona despite reaching the elite and has continued to use his birth name. In his first jūryō tournament in November he almost pulled off a second consecutive championship, losing to Toyohibiki in a playoff after both finished with 11–4 records.

Makuuchi career

After two more strong performances at jūryō Takayasu was promoted to the top makuuchi division in July, 2011. His debut record of 9–6 at maegashira 11 earned him a maegashira rank of no. 6 in the following tournament, then his highest, but he only managed a 6–9 record there.  After a 9–6 score in the November 2011 tournament he was promoted to a new high of maegashira 3. He scored only 6–9 in the January 2012 tourney, but a 10–5 record in March saw him reach maegashira 1 in the May tournament.

Takayasu had his best result in the top division up to that point in the January 2013 tournament, finishing runner up on 12–3 and winning his first sanshō award for Fighting Spirit. He had two gold star wins in 2013, in two different tournaments, both at maegashira 1, and both against Harumafuji. The second win against Harumafuji also helped him procure his first Outstanding Performance prize, and his first promotion to the san'yaku ranks at komusubi. He only lasted one tournament at this rank however, and went into a bit of a slump before bouncing back with an 11–4 at the July 2014 tournament. In the November 2014 tournament he scored against  top-ranked competition, earning two gold stars for defeating Harumafuji and Hakuhō and receiving the Outstanding Performance prize.  This saw him promoted to komusubi once more at the beginning of 2015, but he once again fell short with a 6–9 record.

He had to withdraw from a tournament for the first time in his career in September 2015, but recovered with two winning records in the next two tournaments. After a poor performance in March 2016, a 9–6 result in May saw him promoted to komusubi for the third time. At Nagoya in July he produced his first winning record at a san'yaku rank with eleven wins, beating the ōzeki Kotoshōgiku, Goeido and Terunofuji and being awarded the Special Prize for Technique. September saw him at sekiwake for the first time and he was in contention for the championship at 10–2 after twelve days, although he had a somewhat disappointing end to the tournament losing his last three bouts to maegashira ranked wrestlers. However, he was awarded his third Fighting Spirit Prize. His performance fueled speculation about a potential promotion to ōzeki but he failed to maintain his momentum in November, ending with a 7–8 record.

Back at komusubi in January 2017 Takayasu produced one of his best efforts as he finished in a tie for third place and was awarded the special prize for Fighting Spirit. His 11 wins included victories over yokozuna Kakuryū and Hakuhō and three of the four ōzeki (the fourth ōzeki was his stablemate Kisenosato). In March 2017 Takayasu was back up to sekiwake at West "Sekiwake" #1. Takayasu was able to win his first 10 days straight, the first time he had ever gone 10–0 to start a tournament which put him in contention for the cup. On Day 11 and 12 Takayasu lost against yokozuna Kakuryū and Harumafuji, then on Day 13 lost against Yoshikaze. However, he was able to win the final two days and finish out the tournament with a 12–3 record. For his performance in the tournament he won the Outstanding Performance prize, for the third time. Having 23 wins in the last two tournaments in the titled ranks of san'yaku, it appeared that Takayasu would receive serious attention for promotion to ōzeki if he could achieve around 11 wins or more in the May 2017 tournament. The Chairman of the Japan Sumo Association (JSA), Hakkaku, has called for him to show greater consistency, saying he "is competitive when he follows his winning formula, but he still has many weak points." Takayasu achieved his target, recording his eleventh win with a victory over Harumafuji on the thirteenth day, and was awarded his second Technique prize. Immediately after the tournament Hakkaku announced that an extraordinary meeting of the JSA board of directors would be convened to consider Takayasu's promotion. On May 31, Takayasu was officially promoted to ōzeki. During his promotion speech, he was quoted as saying "I will devote myself to sumo and compete fairly so I can live up to my name as ōzeki."

Ōzeki
In his first tournament as an ōzeki Takayasu won eight of his first ten matches and appeared to be in contention for the championship, but a run of four consecutive defeats followed and he ended with a record of 9–6.  The September tournament saw three of the four yokozuna withdraw beforehand due to injuries, and Takayasu seemed poised to challenge for the championship, but he injured a muscle in his right thigh in a match on the second day, and was himself forced to withdraw. During the November tournament, Takayasu managed to win 8 matches, saving his rank but was again forced to withdraw after Day 12 due to a thigh injury. In January 2018 he had his best result to date as an ōzeki, finishing runner-up to surprise winner Tochinoshin with a 12–3 record. In the March tournament Takayasu started off with two losses but followed those up with 9 straight wins, before being defeated by Chiyomaru. Takayasu then went on to win his last three matches; handing yokozuna Kakuryu, who had already won the tournament going into Day 15, his second loss. Finishing the tournament with a 12–3 record Takayasu was a runner-up to Kakuryu, alongside fellow runner-up Kaisei. He injured his left upper arm in training shortly before the beginning of May tournament and announced his withdrawal from the first day, although he still hoped to enter the tournament later – "I decided to play it safe because I can’t compete in my 100 percent form. I still want to join the tournament if I recover in time." He ended up missing the entire tournament and was kadoban in July, although he retained his ōzeki rank with a 9–6 record. He was runner-up for the fourth time in his career in November 2018, finishing one win behind Takakeishō on 12–3. In July 2019 he injured his left elbow in his Day 8 match with Tamawashi, and withdrew after securing his majority of wins, defaulting against Hakuhō on Day 11. His withdrawal, following Takakeishō, Tochinoshin and Gōeidō, meant four ōzeki were absent from a tournament for the first time since the beginning of the Showa era in 1926. The injury forced him to sit out the following tournament in September.

After starting the November 2019 tournament in Fukuoka with a 3-4 record, Takayasu appeared in the dohyō-iri before the main bouts for Day 8, but then withdrew suddenly from his match against Takarafuji due to lower back pain. Takayasu's stablemaster later confirmed that he would not be re-entering the tournament. As a kadoban ōzeki, a losing record meant that Takayasu was relegated to sekiwake for the next basho. He lost all chances for an immediate promotion back to ōzeki with his sixth loss in the January 2020 tournament, and will have to start over from scratch to regain the rank.

Later career
Takayasu was back in the maegashira ranks for the first time since May 2016 in the March 2020 tournament. He withdrew on Day 5 after four straight losses, with a left thigh injury. He returned in July 2020 with a 10–5 record, his first score in double figures since March 2019. Another 10-5 performance in September 2020 paved the way for his return to the san'yaku ranks; he finished the November 2020 tournament as komusubi with a winning 8-7 record. In the March 2021 tournament Takayasu was two wins ahead of the rest of the field with only one loss entering Day 11, but he was defeated by Shodai for the eighth straight time and saw his lead cut to one win. He lost his final three matches to finish out of the running on 10–5, his final day defeat to Aoiyama costing him a share of the Fighting Spirit prize. He moved up to sekiwake in May and produced another 10–5 record, with chief judge Isegahama Oyakata indicating that winning the championship in July could lead to promotion back to ōzeki. However, he injured his lower back in training shortly before the start of the tournament and announced his withdrawal. While this likely eliminated his re-promotion hopes, stablemaster Tagonoura said that Takayasu could return to competition during the basho. He sat out just the first two days, returning on Day 3.

Takayasu withdrew from the September 2021 tournament with a hip injury after he was driven out of the ring by yokozuna Terunofuji in their Day 11 contest. It was the second straight tournament that he was unable to finish, and his losing record will likely result in him being demoted back to the maegashira ranks in November.

Takayasu sat out of the January 2022 tournament after four individuals at his stable, including his stablemaster (former maegashira Takanotsuru), tested positive for COVID-19. Takayasu returned in the March 2022 tournament to win his first 10 bouts, but ultimately finished 12-3, losing his winning streak and the yūshō playoff to new sekiwake Wakatakakage. With this effort, Takayasu earned the special Fighting Spirit prize, his first sanshō in almost five years.

Soon after the banzuke was released for the July 2022 tournament, Takayasu and a junior stablemate tested positive for COVID-19. Takayasu, and the entire Tagonoura stable, were withdrawn from the tournament a few days later after another junior wrestler tested positive. It was the second time in 2022 that Takayasu has had to sit out of a tournament due to COVID rules. Returning in September, Takayasu was runner-up to Tamawashi with an 11–4 record, having failed to beat Tamawashi on the final day to force a playoff. Takayasu received his sixth career Fighting Spirit Prize for this performance.

Takayasu entered the final day of the November 2022 Tournament with a chance to win his first Emperor's Cup outright but was defeated by maegashira Abi, setting up a three-way playoff between himself, Abi and ōzeki Takakeishō. Takayasu drew Abi in the first playoff match, but lost after his head slammed hard into Abi's chest on the tachi-ai. He appeared stunned, and needed assistance to stand up from the ring. Abi would eventually win the playoff, resulting in Takayasu's third runner-up performance of the year. Takayasu received his fourth Shukun-shō (Outstanding Performance prize) for his efforts.

Takayasu was promoted to sekiwake for the January 2023 tournament, but withdrew after suffering 4 defeats in his first 5 matches. It was later reported that Takayasu pulled out due to a shinbone contusion. This lead to his demotion to maegashira 7 for the March tournament.

Fighting style
Takayasu is an oshi-sumo specialist, preferring pushing and thrusting techniques (tsuki/oshi) to fighting on the opponent's mawashi. His most common winning kimarite so far in his career are yori-kiri (force out), hataki-komi (slap down) and oshi-dashi (push out). He strengthened his physique and his pushing techniques through intense training sessions with his senior stablemate Kisenosato.

Personal life
In October 2019 Takayasu announced his engagement to enka singer . They were married in July 2020 and welcomed their first child, a baby girl, in February 2021. Takayasu credited his strong performance in the July 2020 tournament on the news that his wife was pregnant. He had an equally strong tournament in March 2021 immediately following his daughter’s birth. This has given rise to the popular nickname “Papayasu”. In August 2022, they welcomed their second child, a baby boy.

Career record

See also
List of active gold star earners
Glossary of sumo terms
List of active sumo wrestlers
List of ōzeki
List of sumo tournament top division runners-up
Active special prize winners
List of sumo record holders

References

External links
 

1990 births
Living people
Japanese people of Filipino descent
Japanese sumo wrestlers
Sumo people from Ibaraki Prefecture
People from Tsuchiura
Ōzeki
Sumo wrestlers who use their birth name